The year 1979 in film involved many significant events.

Highest-grossing films

United States and Canada

The top ten 1979 released films by North American gross are as follows:

International

Major events
 March 2 – Buena Vista release their first film since the advent of U.S. movie ratings to not be G-rated, Take Down.
 March 5 – Production begins on The Empire Strikes Back.
 March – Frank Price becomes president of Columbia Pictures.
 May 25 – Alien, a landmark of the science fiction genre, is released.
 May 29 - Mary Pickford, a silent screen legend and Hollywood pioneer who was, at the height of her career, the most famous woman in the world, dies of a stroke.
 May 31 – The Muppet Movie, Jim Henson's Muppets' first foray into the world of feature-length motion pictures, is released in United Kingdom.
 June 11 – John Wayne, a famous Western movie actor, dies at the age of 72 from stomach cancer.
 June 27 – 20th Century Fox Pictures president Alan Ladd Jr. and vice-presidents Jay Kanter and Gareth Wigan agree to leave Fox. 
 June 29 – Moonraker, the 11th film in the James Bond franchise, is released in the United States and goes on to become the highest-grossing film of the year worldwide.
 August 15 – Apocalypse Now is released to worldwide critical acclaim and box office success. Heralded as one of the greatest films ever made to this day.
 September 19 – Don Bluth and a group of fellow animators resign from The Walt Disney Company's animation department to set up a rival studio, Don Bluth Productions.
 October 1 – Alan Ladd Jr., Jay Kanter and Gareth Wigan who agreed to leave Fox earlier in the year formally announce the creation of The Ladd Company.
 October 3 – Producers Benjamin Melniker and Michael E. Uslan purchase the film rights of Batman from DC Comics. It would be another ten years, before a Batman feature film would be fully realized.
 November 1 – Production begins on Raiders of the Lost Ark.
 December 7 – Star Trek: The Motion Picture debuts in the United States to mixed reviews but blockbuster box office, launching a film franchise that leads to 9 sequels and 3 reboots over the next 37 years. It also leads to the creation of five spin-off television series based upon Gene Roddenberry's creation.
 Allied Artists files for bankruptcy.

Awards

Palme d'Or (Cannes Film Festival):
Apocalypse Now, directed by Francis Ford Coppola, United States
The Tin Drum (Die Blechtrommel), directed by Volker Schlöndorff, W. Germany

Golden Bear (Berlin Film Festival):
David, directed by Peter Lilienthal, West Germany

Notable films released in 1979
United States unless stated

#
10, directed by Blake Edwards, starring Dudley Moore, Julie Andrews, Bo Derek, Robert Webber, Brian Dennehy
1941, directed by Steven Spielberg, starring Dan Aykroyd, John Belushi, Tim Matheson, Nancy Allen, Toshiro Mifune, Treat Williams, Warren Oates, Robert Stack

A
The Actress, the Dollars and the Transylvanians (Artista, dolarii şi ardelenii) – (Romania)
L'adolescente (The Adolescent), directed by Jeanne Moreau, starring Simone Signoret – (France)
The Adventure of Sudsakorn, the first and only cel-animated feature film from Thailand
Adventures of Sinbad
Agatha, directed by Michael Apted, starring Vanessa Redgrave and Dustin Hoffman – (U.K.)
Ah! Nomugi Toge (Nomugi Pass) – (Japan)
Air Crew (Ekipazh) – (U.S.S.R.)
Alien, directed by Ridley Scott, starring Tom Skerritt, Sigourney Weaver, Veronica Cartwright, John Hurt, Ian Holm, Harry Dean Stanton, Yaphet Kotto – (US/UK)
All Quiet on the Western Front, a TV film directed by Delbert Mann, starring Richard Thomas and Ernest Borgnine
All That Jazz, directed by Bob Fosse, starring Roy Scheider, Ann Reinking, Leland Palmer, Ben Vereen, John Lithgow, Jessica Lange
An Almost Perfect Affair, starring Keith Carradine and Monica Vitti
Americathon, starring John Ritter and Harvey Korman
The Amityville Horror, directed by Stuart Rosenberg, starring James Brolin, Margot Kidder, Rod Steiger
...And Justice for All, directed by Norman Jewison, starring Al Pacino, John Forsythe, Jack Warden, Christine Lahti, Craig T. Nelson, Jeffrey Tambor
Anti-Clock, directed by Jane Arden – (U.K.)
Apocalypse Now, directed by Francis Ford Coppola, starring Marlon Brando, Robert Duvall, Martin Sheen, Dennis Hopper, Laurence Fishburne, Frederic Forrest
The Apple Dumpling Gang Rides Again, starring Don Knotts and Tim Conway
Arabian Adventure, starring Christopher Lee and Emma Samms – (U.K.)
Ashanti, directed by Richard Fleischer, starring Michael Caine and Peter Ustinov
Autumn Marathon (Osenniy marafon) – (U.S.S.R.)

B
Baby Snakes, directed by Frank Zappa
Ball Lightning (Kulový blesk) – (Czechoslovakia)
Ballad of Tara (Tcherike-ye Tara) – (Iran)
Bear Island, starring Donald Sutherland, Vanessa Redgrave, Richard Widmark, Barbara Parkins
Being There, directed by Hal Ashby, starring Peter Sellers, Shirley MacLaine, Melvyn Douglas, Jack Warden
The Bell Jar, starring Marilyn Hassett, Julie Harris, Anne Jackson
Best Boy, award-winning documentary
Beyond the Poseidon Adventure, directed by Irwin Allen, starring Michael Caine, Telly Savalas, Sally Field, Karl Malden, Shirley Jones
Birth of the Beatles, directed by Richard Marquand
The Bitch, starring Joan Collins – (U.K.)
The Black Hole, directed by Gary Nelson, starring Maximilian Schell, Anthony Perkins, Robert Forster, Ernest Borgnine, Yvette Mimieux, Joseph Bottoms
The Black Stallion, directed by Carroll Ballard, starring Mickey Rooney, Hoyt Axton, Teri Garr, Kelly Reno
Bloodline, directed by Terence Young, starring Audrey Hepburn, Ben Gazzara, James Mason, Gert Fröbe, Beatrice Straight
Bloody Kids, directed by Stephen Frears – (U.K.)
Boardwalk, starring Ruth Gordon, Lee Strasberg, Janet Leigh
Boulevard Nights, directed by Michael Pressman
Breaking Away, directed by Peter Yates, starring Dennis Christopher, Dennis Quaid, Daniel Stern, Jackie Earle Haley, Paul Dooley, Barbara Barrie
Breakthrough, starring Richard Burton, Robert Mitchum, Rod Steiger, Curd Jürgens
Les Bronzés font du ski (a.k.a. French Fried Vacation 2), directed by Patrice Leconte – (France)
The Brood, directed by David Cronenberg, starring Oliver Reed and Samantha Eggar – (Canada)
Buck Rogers in the 25th Century, starring Gil Gerard and Erin Gray
Buffet froid, directed by Bertrand Blier, starring Gérard Depardieu, Bernard Blier, Jean Carmet – (France)
The Bugs Bunny/Road Runner Movie
Butch and Sundance: The Early Days, starring Tom Berenger and William Katt
The Butterfly Murders (Die bian), directed by Tsui Hark – (Hong Kong)
Bye Bye Brazil – (Brazil/France/Argentina)

C
C.H.O.M.P.S., directed by Don Chaffey, starring Wesley Eure, Valerie Bertinelli, Conrad Bain, Red Buttons
California Dreaming, starring Glynnis O'Connor, Dennis Christopher, Tanya Roberts
Caligula, directed by Tinto Brass, written by Gore Vidal, starring Malcolm McDowell, Teresa Ann Savoy, Helen Mirren, Peter O'Toole – (Italy/United States)
Camera Buff. directed by Krzysztof Kieślowski – (Poland)
The Castle of Cagliostro (Rupan sansei: Kariosutoro no shiro), an anime film by Hayao Miyazaki – (Japan)
The Cat and the Canary, starring Honor Blackman, Carol Lynley, Olivia Hussey – (U.K.)
The Champ, directed by Franco Zeffirelli, starring Jon Voight, Faye Dunaway, Ricky Schroder, Jack Warden, Arthur Hill
Chapter Two, starring James Caan, Marsha Mason, Joseph Bologna, Valerie Harper
The China Syndrome, directed by James Bridges, starring Jack Lemmon, Jane Fonda, Michael Douglas
Christ Stopped at Eboli, directed by Francesco Rosi, starring Gian Maria Volonté – (Italy/France)
City on Fire, starring Susan Clark and Ava Gardner
The Concorde ... Airport '79, directed by David Lowell Rich, starring Alain Delon, Susan Blakely, Robert Wagner, George Kennedy
Cuba, directed by Richard Lester, starring Sean Connery, Brooke Adams, Chris Sarandon

D
David – (West Germany) – Golden Bear winner
Derek and Clive Get the Horn, starring Peter Cook and Dudley Moore – (U.K.)
Dirty Ho (Lan tou He), starring Gordon Liu – (Hong Kong)
Don Giovanni, directed by Joseph Losey, starring Ruggero Raimondi, John Macurdy, Kiri Te Kanawa – (Italy/France/U.K./West Germany)
Dracula, directed by John Badham, starring Frank Langella, Laurence Olivier, Trevor Eve – (US/UK)
Dreamer, starring Tim Matheson

E
Eagle's Wing, starring Martin Sheen and Sam Waterston – (U.K.)
The Electric Horseman, directed by Sydney Pollack, starring Robert Redford, Jane Fonda, Valerie Perrine, John Saxon, Willie Nelson
Escape from Alcatraz, directed by Don Siegel, starring Clint Eastwood, Patrick McGoohan, Fred Ward
Escape to Athena, starring Roger Moore, David Niven, Elliott Gould, Stefanie Powers, Claudia Cardinale, Telly Savalas – (U.K.)
The Europeans, directed by James Ivory, starring Lee Remick, Lisa Eichhorn, Kristin Griffith – (U.K.)

F
Fast Break, starring Gabe Kaplan and Bernard King
Felicity, starring Glory Annen – (Australia)
Ffolkes, aka North Sea Hijack, starring Roger Moore, James Mason, Anthony Perkins, Michael Parks – (U.K.)
The Fifth Musketeer, starring Sylvia Kristel, Ursula Andress, Beau Bridges, Ian McShane, Rex Harrison – (Austria/West Germany)
Firepower, directed by Michael Winner, starring Sophia Loren, James Coburn, O. J. Simpson – (U.K.)
First Case, Second Case (Qazieh, Shekl-e Avval, Shekl-e Dovom), directed by Abbas Kiarostami – (Iran)
The First Great Train Robbery, starring Sean Connery, Lesley-Anne Down, Donald Sutherland – (U.K.)
A Force of One, starring Chuck Norris and Jennifer O'Neill
The Frisco Kid, directed by Robert Aldrich, starring Gene Wilder, Harrison Ford
French Postcards, starring Miles Chapin, David Marshall Grant, Debra Winger

G
Gal Young Un, directed by Victor Nuñez
Game for Vultures, directed by James Fargo, starring Richard Harris, Joan Collins and Richard Roundtree
The Genealogy (Jokbo) – (South Korea)
Going in Style, directed by Martin Brest, starring George Burns, Art Carney, Lee Strasberg, Charles Hallahan
The Glove, starring John Saxon and Roosevelt Grier
Gol Maal (Confusion) – (India)
Goldengirl, starring Susan Anton, James Coburn, Leslie Caron
Grass Labyrinth (Kusa Meikyū) – (Japan)
The Great Santini, starring Robert Duvall, Michael O'Keefe, Blythe Danner, Lisa Jane Persky, Stan Shaw
The Great Riviera Bank Robbery, starring Ian McShane – (U.K.)

H
Hair, directed by Miloš Forman, starring John Savage, Treat Williams, Beverly D'Angelo
The Hamburg Syndrome, directed by Peter Fleischmann and starring Helmut Griem, Fernando Arrabal and Carline Seiser – West Germany
Hanover Street, directed by Peter Hyams, starring Harrison Ford, Lesley-Anne Down, Christopher Plummer – (US/UK)
Hardcore, directed by Paul Schrader, starring George C. Scott and Peter Boyle
Heart of the Forest (El corazón del bosque) – (Spain)
Heartland, directed by Richard Pearce, starring Rip Torn and Conchata Ferrell – Golden Bear winner, Sundance Grand Jury Prize
Hot Stuff, directed by and starring Dom DeLuise, with Suzanne Pleshette, Ossie Davis, Jerry Reed
The Human Factor, starring Richard Attenborough, John Gielgud, Derek Jacobi – (U.K.)
Hurricane, starring Mia Farrow, Jason Robards, Max von Sydow, Trevor Howard
The Hussy (La drôlesse) – (France)
The Hypothesis of the Stolen Painting (L'Hypothèse du tableau volé), directed by Raúl Ruiz – (France)

I
I as in Icarus (I... comme Icare), starring Yves Montand – (France)
The In-Laws, directed by Arthur Hiller, starring Alan Arkin and Peter Falk

J
J-Men Forever, directed by Richard Patterson, starring Peter Bergman, M. G. Kelly, Philip Proctor
Jack Frost, directed by Rankin/Bass, starring Robert Morse
Jaguar – (Philippines)
The Jerk, directed by Carl Reiner, starring Steve Martin and Bernadette Peters
Jesus, directed by Peter Sykes and John Krisch, starring Brian Deacon – (Australia/US/UK)
Just You and Me, Kid, starring George Burns and Brooke Shields

K
Kaala Patthar (Black Stone), starring Shashi Kapoor – (India)
Kassbach – Ein Porträt (Kassbach – A Portrait) – (Austria)
The Kids Are Alright, a rockumentary featuring The Who – (U.K.)
Knockabout, directed by and starring Sammo Hung – (Hong Kong)
Kramer vs. Kramer, directed by Robert Benton, starring Dustin Hoffman and Meryl Streep (both won Oscars), Justin Henry, JoBeth Williams, Jane Alexander

L
Lady Oscar, starring Catriona MacColl and Patsy Kensit – (France/Japan)
Le Pétomane, starring Leonard Rossiter and Graham Stark
The Lady Vanishes, starring Elliott Gould, Cybill Shepherd, Angela Lansbury
Last Embrace, directed by Jonathan Demme, starring Roy Scheider and Janet Margolin
The Last of the Knucklemen – (Australia)
A Little Romance, directed by George Roy Hill, starring Laurence Olivier, Diane Lane, Sally Kellerman – (France/United States)
Little Tragedies (Malenkie tragedii) – (U.S.S.R.)
Love and Bullets, directed by Stuart Rosenberg, starring Charles Bronson, Jill Ireland, Rod Steiger
Love at First Bite, starring George Hamilton and Susan Saint James
Love on the Run (L'amour en fuite), directed by François Truffaut – (France)
Lovers and Liars (Viaggio con Anita), starring Goldie Hawn and Giancarlo Giannini – (Italy/France)
La Luna, directed by Bernardo Bertolucci, starring Jill Clayburgh – (Italy)

M
Mad Max, directed by George Miller, starring Mel Gibson – (Australia)
The Magician of Lublin, starring Alan Arkin, Louise Fletcher, Valerie Perrine
Magnificent Butcher (Lin shi rong), starring Sammo Hung – (Hong Kong)
The Main Event, starring Barbra Streisand and Ryan O'Neal
Mamá cumple cien años (Mama Turns 100), directed by Carlos Saura, starring Geraldine Chaplin – (Spain)
Manhattan, directed by and starring Woody Allen, with Diane Keaton, Michael Murphy, Mariel Hemingway, Anne Byrne, Meryl Streep
A Man, a Woman, and a Bank, starring Donald Sutherland and Brooke Adams
The Marriage of Maria Braun, directed by Rainer Werner Fassbinder, starring Hanna Schygulla – (West Germany)
Maula Jatt – (Pakistan)
Meatballs, directed by Ivan Reitman, starring Bill Murray – (Canada)
The Meeting Place Cannot Be Changed (Mesto vstrechi izmenit nelzya) – (U.S.S.R.)
Meetings with Remarkable Men, Gurdjieff biography directed by Peter Brook – (U.K.)
Meteor, directed by Ronald Neame, starring Sean Connery, Natalie Wood, Karl Malden, Henry Fonda, Martin Landau, Trevor Howard
Monty Python's Life of Brian, directed by Terry Jones, starring Graham Chapman, John Cleese, Terry Gilliam, Eric Idle, Terry Jones, Michael Palin – (U.K.)
Moonraker, directed by Lewis Gilbert, starring Roger Moore (as James Bond), with Lois Chiles, Michael Lonsdale, Richard Kiel – (U.K.)
More American Graffiti, starring Candy Clark, Ron Howard, Paul Le Mat, Charles Martin Smith, Cindy Williams
Mr. Mike's Mondo Video, starring Michael O'Donoghue, Dan Aykroyd, Bill Murray
The Muppet Movie, made by Jim Henson, with Charles Durning and Dom DeLuise
Murder by Decree (British/ Canadian), a Sherlock Holmes mystery directed by Bob Clark, starring Christopher Plummer (as Sherlock Holmes) and James Mason as Watson– (U.K./Canada)
My Brilliant Career, directed by Gillian Armstrong, starring Judy Davis and Sam Neill – (Australia)

N
Nightwing, directed by Arthur Hiller, starring Nick Mancuso, David Warner, Kathryn Harrold, Stephen Macht, Strother Martin, Charles Hallahan, Donald Hotton
Noorie, directed by Manmohan Krishna – (India)
Norma Rae, directed by Martin Ritt, starring Sally Field, Ron Leibman, Beau Bridges
The North Avenue Irregulars, starring Edward Herrmann, Barbara Harris, Susan Clark, Cloris Leachman, Karen Valentine, Virginia Capers, Michael Constantine
North Dallas Forty, starring Nick Nolte, Mac Davis, G. D. Spradlin, Dayle Haddon, Bo Svenson, John Matuszak
Nosferatu the Vampyre (Nosferatu: Phantom der Nach), directed by Werner Herzog, starring Klaus Kinski, Isabelle Adjani, Bruno Ganz – (West Germany)

O
The Odd Angry Shot, starring Bryan Brown – (Australia)
The Odd Couple (Bo ming chan dao duo ming qiang), starring Sammo Hung – (Hong Kong)
The Onion Field, directed by Harold Becker, starring James Woods, John Savage, Franklyn Seales, Ted Danson
Operación Ogro, directed by Gillo Pontecorvo, starring Gian Maria Volonté – (Spain/Italy)
Over the Edge, directed by Jonathan Kaplan, starring Matt Dillon

P
The Passage, starring Anthony Quinn, James Mason, Malcolm McDowell, Patricia Neal, Kay Lenz
A Perfect Couple, directed by Robert Altman, starring Paul Dooley and Marta Heflin
Peruvazhiyambalam, directed by Padmarajan – (India)
Les petites fugues (The Little Fugitives) – (Switzerland)
Phantasm, directed by Don Coscarelli
A Pleasure Doing Business, directed by Steven Vagnino, starring Conrad Bain, John Byner, Alan Oppenheimer and Misty Rowe
The Plank, directed by and starring Eric Sykes, with Arthur Lowe – (U.K.)
The Plumber, directed by Peter Weir, starring Judy Morris – (Australia)
Prince Nezha's Triumph Against Dragon King (Nezha nao hai), an animated film – (China)
The Prisoner of Zenda, starring Peter Sellers, Lynne Frederick and Lionel Jeffries
The Prize Fighter, starring Don Knotts and Tim Conway
Prophecy, directed by John Frankenheimer, starring Talia Shire, Robert Foxworth, Richard Dysart, Armand Assante

Q
Quadrophenia, directed by Franc Roddam, starring Phil Daniels, Leslie Ash, Ray Winstone, with music by The Who – (U.K.)

R
Real Life, directed by and starring Albert Brooks, with Charles Grodin
Richard Pryor: Live in Concert
Rich Kids, starring Trini Alvarado and John Lithgow
Rock 'n' Roll High School, produced by Roger Corman, featuring The Ramones
Rocky II, directed by and starring Sylvester Stallone, with Carl Weathers, Talia Shire, Burgess Meredith, Burt Young
Roller Boogie, directed by Mark L. Lester, starring Linda Blair, Jim Bray, Albert Insinnia, Jimmy Van Patten, Kimberly Beck, Stoney Jackson, Beverly Garland, Mark Goddard
The Rose, directed by Mark Rydell, starring Bette Midler, Alan Bates, Frederic Forrest
Running, directed by Steven Hilliard Stern, starring Michael Douglas and Susan Anspach

S
Saint Jack, directed by Peter Bogdanovich, starring Ben Gazzara
Scavenger Hunt, starring Cloris Leachman, Cleavon Little, Vincent Price, Tony Randall
Scum, starring Ray Winstone – (U.K.)
A Scream from Silence (Mourir à tue-tête) – (Canada)
The Seduction of Joe Tynan, starring Alan Alda, Meryl Streep, Melvyn Douglas, Barbara Harris, Rip Torn
A Sense of Freedom, directed by John Mackenzie – (U.K.)
Série noire (Black Series), directed by Alain Corneau – (France)
Siberiade, directed by Andrei Konchalovsky – (U.S.S.R)
Sisters, or the Balance of Happiness (Schwestern oder Die Balance des Glücks), directed by Margarethe von Trotta – (West Germany)
Skatetown, U.S.A., starring Scott Baio, Flip Wilson, Maureen McCormick, Patrick Swayze
Something Out of Nothing, directed by Nikola Rudarov, starring Asen Kisimov, Stefan Danailov, Aneta Sotirova – (Bulgaria)
Stalker, directed by Andrei Tarkovsky – (U.S.S.R.)
Star Trek: The Motion Picture, directed by Robert Wise, starring William Shatner, Leonard Nimoy, Persis Khambatta, Stephen Collins
Starting Over, directed by Alan J. Pakula, starring Burt Reynolds, Jill Clayburgh, Candice Bergen, Charles Durning
Suhaag (a.k.a. Sign of Marriage), starring Amitabh Bachchan, Shashi Kapoor, Rekha – (India)
The Survivors (Los sobrevivientes) – (Cuba)

T
Take Down, starring Lorenzo Lamas and Maureen McCormick
Tale of Tales (Skazka skazok), an animated film – (U.S.S.R.)
Tarka the Otter, narrated by Peter Ustinov – (U.K.)
The Tempest, directed by Derek Jarman, starring Toyah Willcox – (U.K.)
Tess, directed by Roman Polanski, starring Nastassja Kinski – (France/U.K.)
That Summer!, starring Ray Winstone – (U.K.)
The Theme (Tema), directed by Gleb Panfilov, starring Mikhail Ulyanov, Inna Churikova, Stanislav Lyubshin, and Yevgeni Vesnik. Winner of 1987 Golden Bear – (U.S.S.R.)
The Third Generation (Die Dritte Generation), directed by Rainer Werner Fassbinder, starring Hanna Schygulla – (West Germany)
Those Wonderful Movie Cranks (Báječní muži s klikou), directed by Jiří Menzel – (Czechoslovakia)
La Tía Alejandra (Aunt Alejandra) – (Mexico)
Tilt,  directed by Rudy Durand, starring Brooke Shields, Ken Marshall and Charles Durning
Tim, starring Mel Gibson and Piper Laurie – (Australia)
Time After Time, directed by Nicholas Meyer, starring Malcolm McDowell, David Warner, Mary Steenburgen
The Tin Drum (Die Blechtrommel), directed by Volker Schlöndorff, starring David Bennent – (West Germany) – Palme d'Or winner
To Forget Venice (Dimenticare Venezia), directed by Franco Brusati, starring Mariangela Melato and Erland Josephson – (Italy)
Tourist Trap, starring Chuck Connors and Tanya Roberts

U
Ultraman – (Japan)
Ultraman: Great Monster Decisive Battle – (Japan)
Uncle Marin, the Billionaire (Nea Mărin miliardar) – (Romania)

V
Vengeance Is Mine (fukushū suru wa ware ni ari), directed by Shohei Imamura, starring Ken Ogata – (Japan)
The Villain, directed by Hal Needham, starring Kirk Douglas, Ann-Margret, Arnold Schwarzenegger
The Visitor, starring John Huston, Glenn Ford, Shelley Winters

W
Wanda Nevada, directed by and starring Peter Fonda, with Brooke Shields
The Wanderers, starring Ken Wahl and Karen Allen
The Warriors, directed by Walter Hill, starring Michael Beck, James Remar, David Patrick Kelly, Deborah Van Valkenburgh
When a Stranger Calls, starring Charles Durning and Carol Kane
Winter Kills, starring Jeff Bridges, John Huston, Anthony Perkins
Wise Blood, directed by and starring John Huston, with Brad Dourif – (United States/West Germany)
Woman Between Wolf and Dog (Femme entre chien et loup) – (Belgium/France)
Woyzeck, directed by Werner Herzog, starring Klaus Kinski and Eva Mattes – (West Germany)
The Wretches Are Still Singing (Τα Κουρέλια Τραγουδάνε Ακόμα), directed by Nikos Nikolaidis – (Greece)

Y
Yanks, directed by John Schlesinger, starring Richard Gere, Lisa Eichhorn, Vanessa Redgrave – (US/UK)
Yesterday's Hero, directed by Neil Leifer, starring Ian McShane, Suzanne Somers, Adam Faith and Paul Nicholas – (U.K.)

Z
Zombi 2, directed by Lucio Fulci, starring Tisa Farrow, Ian McCulloch, Richard Johnson – (Italy)
Zulu Dawn, directed by Douglas Hickox, starring Peter O'Toole, Burt Lancaster, Simon Ward – (United States/South Africa/Netherlands)

1979 Wide-release movies

January–March

April–June

July–September

October–December

Births
 January 1 – Vidya Balan, Indian actress
 January 6 – Cristela Alonzo, American comedian, actress, writer and producer
 January 8
Ashraf Barhom, Israeli-Arab actor
Sarah Polley, Canadian actress
 January 16 – Aaliyah, American actress and singer (d. 2001)
 January 24 – Tatyana Ali, American actress and singer
 January 26 – Sara Rue, American actress
 January 29 – Andrew Keegan, American actor
 February 1 – Rachelle Lefevre, Canadian actress
 February 2 – Shamita Shetty, Indian actress
 February 3 – Costa Ronin, Australian actor and cinematographer
 February 9 – Zhang Ziyi, Chinese actress and dancer
 February 11 – Brandy Norwood, American actress and singer
 February 13 – Mena Suvari, American actress
 February 21
Tituss Burgess, American actor and singer
Maryke Hendrikse, Bahamian-born Canadian voice actress
Jennifer Love Hewitt, American actress and singer
Jordan Peele, American actor, comedian, writer, director and producer
 March 3 – Patrick Renna, American actor
 March 5 – Riki Lindhome, American actress, comedian and musician
 March 9 – Oscar Isaac, Guatemalan-American actor
 March 10
Edi Gathegi, Kenyan-American actor
Danny Pudi, American actor
 March 17 – Stephen Kramer Glickman, Canadian actor, music producer and stand-up comedian
 March 18 – Adam Levine, American singer, songwriter, musician and actor
 March 20 – Bianca Lawson, American actress
 March 24 – Lake Bell, American actress, director and screenwriter
 March 25 – Lee Pace, American actor
 March 28 – Shakib Khan, Bangladeshi film actor, producer, singer, film organiser and media personalities
 March 29 – De'Angelo Wilson, American actor and rapper (d. 2008)
 April 4
 Bunko Kanazawa, Japanese actress
 Heath Ledger, Australian actor (d. 2008)
 Natasha Lyonne, American actress
 April 5 – Josh Boone (director), American filmmaker
 April 11 – Josh Server, American actor
 April 12
Claire Danes, American actress
Paul Nicholls (actor), English actor
 April 15 - Luke Evans, Welsh actor and singer
 April 19 – Kate Hudson, American actress
 April 21 – James McAvoy, Scottish actor
 April 23 – Jaime King, American actress
 April 26 – Klára Issová, Czech actress
 May 5 – Vincent Kartheiser, American actor
 May 7 – Yōsuke Kubozuka, Japanese actor
 May 9 – Rosario Dawson, American actress
 May 12 – Aaron Yoo, Korean-American actor
 May 19 – Bérénice Marlohe, French actress
 May 22 – Maggie Q, American actress
 May 23 – Josh Cooley, American animator, screenwriter, director and voice actor
 May 28
Jesse Bradford, American actor
Monica Keena, American actress
 June 2 - Morena Baccarin, Brazilian actress
 June 7 – Anna Torv, Australian actress
 June 12 - Wil Horneff, American former child actor
 June 17 – Young Maylay, American rapper, producer and voice actor
 June 21 – Chris Pratt, American actor
 June 24 – Mindy Kaling, American writer and actress
 June 27 – Benjamin Speed, Australian film composer
 July 3 – Ludivine Sagnier, French actress
 July 6
Kevin Hart, American actor
Abdul Salis, British actor
 July 10 – Gong Yoo, South Korean actor
 July 12 – Omid Abtahi, Iranian-American actor
 July 14 – Scott Porter, American actor
 July 16 – Jayma Mays, American actress
 July 17 – Mike Vogel, American actor and former model
 July 19 – David Sakurai, Danish-Japanese actor, director and scriptwriter
 July 26 - Mageina Tovah, American actress
 July 31 – B. J. Novak, American writer and actor
 August 1 – Jason Momoa, American actor and filmmaker
 August 3 – Evangeline Lilly, Canadian actress
 August 6 – Dayahang Rai, Nepalese actor
 August 10 – JoAnna Garcia Swisher, American actress
 August 13 - Kasia Smutniak, Polish-Italian actress and model
 August 14 - Jamie Parker, English actor and singer
 August 22 – Brandon Adams (actor), American actor
 August 23 – Claire Grant, American actress, model and producer
 August 25 – Şebnem Bozoklu, Turkish actress 
 August 26 – Erik Valdez, American actor
 August 27 – Aaron Paul, American actor
 August 29 – Dan Harris (screenwriter), American screenwriter and director
 August 31 – Yuvan Shankar Raja, Indian film composer
 September 8 – Pink, American singer and actress
 September 11
Ariana Richards, American actress
Hu Ting-ting, English-born Taiwanese actress
 September 18 – Alison Lohman, American former actress
 September 19 – Noémie Lenoir, French model and actress
 September 20 – Chris Tardio, American actor
 September 22 – MyAnna Buring, Swedish-born actress
 September 23 – Lisa Loven Kongsli, Norwegian actress
 September 26 - Mark Famiglietti, American actor, screenwriter and producer
 September 27 – Jad Saxton, American voice actress
 September 30 – Jonathan Kasdan, American screenwriter, director, producer and actor
 October 1 – Marielle Heller, American film director
 October 4
Caitríona Balfe, Irish actress
Rachael Leigh Cook, American actress
 October 6 – Sareh Bayat, Iranian actress
 October 7
Tang Wei, Chinese actress
Aaron Ashmore and Shawn Ashmore, Canadian actors
 October 8 – Kristanna Loken, American actress
 October 9 – Brandon Routh, American actor
 October 20 – John Krasinski, American actor and filmmaker
 October 28 – Natina Reed, American singer-songwriter, rapper and actress (d. 2012)
 October 29 – Maya Karin, Malaysian actress
 October 30 - James A. Woods, Canadian actor
 October 31 – Erica Cerra, Canadian actress
 November 5 - Leonardo Nam, Australian actor
 November 8 – Dania Ramirez, Dominican actress
 November 9 – Matt McCarthy (comedian), American comedian, actor and writer
 November 13 – Riccardo Scamarcio, Italian actor and producer
 November 14 – Olga Kurylenko, Ukrainian-French actress
 November 19 – Barry Jenkins, American film director
 November 22 – Andrew Knott, British actor
 November 23 – Jonathan Sadowski, American actor
 November 25 – Joel Kinnaman, Swedish-American actor
 November 28 – Daniel Henney, American actor and model
 December 3 – Tiffany Haddish, American comedian and actress
 December 5 – Nick Stahl, American actor
 December 7 – Eric Bauza, Canadian-born American voice actor, stand-up comedian and animation artist
 December 11 – Rider Strong, American actor
 December 15 – Adam Brody, American actor, writer, musician and producer
 December 20 - Ramón Rodríguez (actor), Puerto Rican actor
 December 23 – Summer Altice, American model and actress
 December 26 – Chris Daughtry, American actor and singer
 December 29 – Diego Luna, Mexican actor, director and producer

Deaths

Film debuts
Rosanna Arquette – More American Graffiti
Tobin Bell - Manhattan
Lorraine Bracco – Duos sur canapé
Grand L. Bush – Hair
Frances Conroy – Manhattan
Matt Craven – Meatballs
Denise Crosby – 10
Ted Danson – The Onion Field
Keith David – Disco Godfather
Matt Dillon – Over the Edge
Lisa Eichhorn – The Europeans
Cary Elwes – Yesterday's Hero
Giancarlo Esposito – Running
Danny Glover – Escape from Alcatraz
Bruce Greenwood – Bear Island
Linda Hamilton – Night Flowers
Dennis Haysbert – Scoring
Anna Maria Horsford – An Almost Perfect Affair
Lucinda Jenney – Impostors
Michael Jeter – Hair
Sam J. Jones – 10
David Keith –  The Great Santini
David Patrick Kelly – The Warriors
Wayne Knight – The Wanderers
Christine Lahti – ...And Justice for All
Diane Lane – A Little Romance
Carl Lumbly – Escape from Alcatraz
Hayao Miyazaki (director) – The Castle of Cagliostro
Bill Nighy – The Bitch
Will Patton – Minus Zero
David Paymer – The In-Laws
Chris Penn – Charlie and the Talking Buzzard
Elizabeth Peña – El Super
Rhea Perlman – Swap Meet
CCH Pounder – All That Jazz
Jean Reno – The Hypothesis of the Stolen Painting
Mickey Rourke – 1941
Jay O. Sanders – Starting Over
Raynor Scheine – Something Short of Paradise
Wallace Shawn – Manhattan
Martin Short – Lost and Found
John Snyder – The Warriors
Timothy Spall – Quadrophenia
Mike Starr – Squeeze Play!
Daniel Stern – Breaking Away
Patrick Swayze – Skatetown, U.S.A.
Jean-Claude Van Damme – Woman Between Wolf and Dog
Christoph Waltz – Breakthrough
Peter Weller – Butch and Sundance: The Early Days
JoBeth Williams – Kramer vs. Kramer
Ray Winstone – That Summer!

Notes

References

 
Film by year